Erik Johansson may refer to:

 Erik Johansson Vasa (1470–1520), Swedish nobleman
 Erik Johansson (rower) (1911–1961), Swedish Olympic rower
 Karl-Erik Johansson (1924–1987), Finnish rower
 Erik Johansson (ice hockey) (1927–1992), Swedish ice hockey player
 Erik Johansson, a former member of the Riksdag (1973–1979) with the Centre Party
 Erik Johansson (orienteer), Swedish gold medallist at the 1976 World Orienteering Championships
 Erik Johansson (footballer, born 1976), Swedish retired football midfielder
 Erik Johansson (pentathlete), Swedish pentathlete at the 2004 Summer Olympics
 Erik Johansson (artist) (born 1985), Swedish photographic surrealist
 Erkki Kaila (1867–1944), previously Erik Johansson, Archbishop of Turku
 Erik Berg (footballer) (born 1988), né Johansson, Swedish footballer

See also
 Eric Johansson (disambiguation)